Gloria (meaning glory in Spanish) was a central heating system used in Castile beginning in the Middle Ages.  It was a direct descendant of the Roman hypocaust, and due to its slow rate of combustion, it allowed people to use smaller fuels such as hay instead of wood.

Description
The Gloria consisted of a firebox, generally located outside (in a courtyard, for example), which burned hay, and one or more ducts that ran under the floors of the rooms to be heated.  The warm exhaust gases from the combustion would pass through these ducts and then be released outside through a vertical flue.

The system is more efficient than a fireplace, because the rate of combustion (and therefore the heat output) can be regulated by restricting the airflow into the firebox.  Moreover, the air required for combustion does not have to pass through the interior of the building, which reduces cold drafts.  Finally, because the firebox is not open to the interior, there is no risk of filling the interior with smoke.

Despite these benefits, it is not advisable to use this system today, as modern furnaces are far more efficient.  The modern equivalent of the Gloria would be underfloor heating, which uses piped hot water under the floor to heat rooms, and like the Gloria, has the benefit of reducing the temperature gradients from floor to ceiling.

See also
Hypocaust the Roman precursor of the Gloria
Ondol, a similar system used in Korea

References

Martin Muñoz De Las Posadas

External links
Medieval Heating System Lives on in Spain

Heating